was a Japanese noble, statesman, and renowned calligrapher of the middle Heian period. Grandson and adopted son of the daijō-daijin Fujiwara no Saneyori and son of major general of the imperial guard , he is honored as one of the Sanseki, a group of outstanding calligraphers.

Life 
He passed through two minor military positions until, in 967, his adoptive father Fujiwara no Saneyori was appointed as regent to the newly ascended Emperor Reizei.

In the following courts of Emperor Kazan and Emperor Ichijō, Sukemasa was repeatedly passed over for promotion in favor of Kazan's relative Fujiwara no Yoshichika and then Ichijō's relatives Fujiwara no Michitaka, Fujiwara no Michikane, and Fujiwara no Michinaga. In 991, he resigned his post as sangi and moved to Kyushu as vice-minister of the Dazaifu.

Sukemasa died on August 19, 998, at the age of 55.

Personality and anecdotes 
Sukemasa was recognized for his excellent calligraphy early on and was particularly esteemed as the leading practitioner of cursive script. His work adorned the folding screens used at the  feasts following the coronations of Emperors En'yū, Kazan, and Ichijō.

However, Sukemasa loved sake, and disgraced himself on numerous occasions. He was extremely neglectful of his duties and lacking in common sense, and the Ōkagami calls him a "slovenly man" (如泥人). That said, some of his documents as a sangi remain, and he did seem to have some views on ancient practices and customs, in which his family was well versed.

The Ōkagami contains two anecdotes about Sukemasa. In one, as Sukemasa returns to Kyōto from his assignment to Kyushu, he receives an oracle from Ōyamazumi Shrine in a dream and then writes down the shrine's motto on its gate. In the other, the regent Fujiwara no Michitaka commands Sukemasa to write a poem on a sliding screen for his new palace, but Sukemasa arrives late and ruins Michitaka's mood.

Extant works 

, held by The Kagawa Museum – The term  refers to kanshi or waka transcribed in a particular format. This is the only such work remaining from the Heian period.
, held by the Hatakeyama Memorial Museum of Fine Art – Written in 991 as Sukemasa was en route to his assignment in Kyushu and suddenly remembered in Shimonoseki that he had forgotten to greet the regent Fujiwara no Michitaka before his departure. In this letter of apology, he asked his nephew  to smooth things out between them. The sense of speed in its cursive calligraphy style gives it a unique character.
, held by the Museum of the Imperial Collections – a letter
, held by the  – Written in 982 while Sukemasa was serving as governor of Iyo Province, this was a letter of apology addressed to the regent Fujiwara no Yoritada via his household steward. Sukemasa apologizes for neglecting his paperwork, leaving the New Year's banquet before Yoritada himself, and failing to attend Yoritada's daughter Junshi's wedding to Emperor En'yū.
 – a letter
, held by the  – a letter

Genealogy 
Father: 
Mother: daughter of 
Wife: , daughter of 
Son: 
Daughter: wife of

Notes

References 
Frederic, Louis (2002). "Japan Encyclopedia." Cambridge, Massachusetts: Harvard University Press.

10th-century Japanese calligraphers
Fujiwara clan
944 births
998 deaths